Bobby Satria (born 24 August 1986 in Padang) is an Indonesian professional footballer who plays as a centre-back for Liga 3 club Tiga Naga. He has a Chinese descent.

Club career

Muba Babel United
He was signed for Muba Babel United to play in Liga 2 in the 2020 season. This season was suspended on 27 March 2020 due to the COVID-19 pandemic. The season was abandoned and was declared void on 20 January 2021.

Honours

Club
Sriwijaya
 Indonesian Community Shield: 2010
 Indonesian Inter Island Cup: 2010
 Piala Indonesia: 2010

References

External links
 Bobby Satria at Soccerway
 Bobby Satria at Liga Indonesia

1986 births
Living people
Liga 1 (Indonesia) players
Liga 2 (Indonesia) players
People from Padang
Indonesian footballers
Sriwijaya F.C. players
Bali United F.C. players
Persita Tangerang players
Persebaya Surabaya players
Mitra Kukar players
PSPS Pekanbaru players
Muba Babel United F.C. players
Indonesian people of Chinese descent
Indonesian sportspeople of Chinese descent
Association football defenders
Footballers at the 2006 Asian Games
Asian Games competitors for Indonesia
Sportspeople from West Sumatra